The Samsung Galaxy A series is a line of mid-range smartphones and tablets manufactured by Samsung Electronics as part of their Galaxy line. The first model in the series was the first-generation Galaxy Alpha, released on 31 October 2014.

Following the announcement of the 2017 series, Samsung announced that they hoped to sell up to 20 million Galaxy A series smartphones, targeting consumers in Europe, Africa, Asia, the Middle East and Latin America.

As of 2020, most of the Galaxy A series models are available in most countries. Galaxy Tab A is also part of the A series and is available in most countries as well.

Timeline

Predecessor 
The "Galaxy A" nameplate first appeared on the Samsung SHW-M100S, which was released in 2010 exclusively for the South Korean market and known as the Samsung Anycall Galaxy A. It was a mid-range device and positioned well below the flagship Galaxy S.

Samsung Galaxy Alpha and A (2015) series 
The Samsung Galaxy Alpha was introduced on 13 August 2014 and released in September 2014. A high-end device, the Galaxy Alpha is Samsung's first smartphone to incorporate a metallic frame and more premium materials, although the remainder of its physical appearance still resembles previous models such as the Galaxy S5. It also incorporates the Qualcomm Snapdragon 801 or Samsung's new Exynos 5430 system-on-chip, which is the first mobile system-on-chip to use a 20 nanometer manufacturing process. However, the Galaxy Alpha received mixed reviews: although praised for its higher quality build and design in comparison to earlier Galaxy models' utilitarian plastic construction, the device was criticized for its modest specifications in comparison to the flagship Galaxy S5, with the Alpha being criticized for lacking water resistance, lower resolution screen (720p versus 1080p) and no MicroSD slot for expandable storage. The Alpha also debuted at a price too high for what some considered to be a "mid-range" smartphone, as although it did share the same Snapdragon 801 as the Galaxy S5, most earlier phones with the Snapdragon 801 had already been on the market for months and saw price drops. Following its launch, Samsung Electronics CEO JK Shin explained that the Alpha was "built and designed based on the specific desires of the consumer market." The company touted that the Galaxy Alpha would mark a "new design approach" for Samsung's products, and that elements from the Alpha could appear on future Samsung models. Its operating system is based on Android 4.4.4 "KitKat" with its own version of TouchWiz UI. Several updates were made throughout the world and in April 2015, Android 5.0.2 "Lollipop" was made available through an OTA update.

Samsung Galaxy Tab A 
In March 2015, Samsung introduced the Galaxy Tab A series with 8.0 inch and 9.7 inch displays, a S Pen stylus, as well as preloaded Samsung applications. The S Pen feature on the Galaxy Tab A series,  makes the first Samsung Galaxy device to be equipped with the Samsung stylus outside of the Note series.

Samsung Galaxy A (2016) series 
New features were introduced in the Galaxy A 2016 Series which includes metal and glass body, NFC which supports Samsung Pay, Samsung's Adaptive Fast charging feature and increased battery life. The Galaxy A (2016) series are very similar to the Galaxy S6, and the Galaxy Note 5 flagships, which were released in April 2015, and August 2015, respectively.

Samsung Galaxy A (2017) series 
In January 2017, Samsung unveiled the 2017 edition of the Galaxy A series. Newly improved features include 16-megapixel front and back cameras, an Exynos 7 Octa 7880 SoC, a 3D glass display (similar to Samsung Galaxy S6 edge+, Galaxy Note 5 and Galaxy S7), barometer and gyroscope sensors and IP68 certification  for water and dust resistance as well as support for Gear 360 (2017). The new design of the series are very similar to the Galaxy S7 and the S7 Edge, released in March 2016. The series comprises three models: Galaxy A3, Galaxy A5, and Galaxy A7. This was the last Galaxy A series to use the TouchWiz user interface, before being superseded by Samsung Experience and One UI in later models.

Samsung Galaxy A (2018) series 
The 2018 Galaxy A Series introduces many high-end features for the first time in the Galaxy A lineup, including multi-lens camera, Infinity Display, Adaptive Fast Charging, IP68 certification, and revamped design. This series uses Samsung Experience UI derived from the Galaxy S8 and Galaxy Note 9. The series comprises seven models: Galaxy A6, Galaxy A6+, Galaxy A7, Galaxy A8, Galaxy A8+, Galaxy A8 Star, and Galaxy A9.

Samsung Galaxy Ax0 series 
Samsung introduced the 2019 Galaxy A Series in February 2019, alongside the online-exclusive Galaxy M Series. Unlike all the previous models, the lineup shifts to the new two-digit nomenclature first introduced in the Galaxy S10. It retains the higher-end features previously introduced in the Galaxy A 2018 series with several improvements, alongside a "waterdrop" notch display (also debuted in the Galaxy M series), higher battery capacity, newer SoCs, and higher memory capacity. The video stabilization feature returned after it was removed from the Galaxy A 2017 series, but IP67 rating was removed on the higher models. This lineup, except the A2 Core, features One UI user interface, in accordance to the S10 series. The series comprises the most numerous models of the Galaxy A series, with eighteen models – Galaxy A2 Core, Galaxy A10e, Galaxy A10, Galaxy A10s, Galaxy A20, Galaxy A20s, Galaxy A30, Galaxy A30s, Galaxy A40, Galaxy A40s, Galaxy A50, Galaxy A50s, Galaxy A60, Galaxy A70, Galaxy A70s, Galaxy A80 and Galaxy A90.

Samsung Galaxy Ax1 series 
Samsung introduced the 2020 Galaxy A series a few months after the release of mid-generation refresh of the 2019 series (those with the "s" suffix). The series brought new features such as geometric design, newer and faster SoCs (compared to their predecessor), hole-punch display (on some devices) & increased RAM and storage options. The series comprises eleven models – Galaxy A01 Core, Galaxy A01, Galaxy A11, Galaxy A21, Galaxy A21s, Galaxy A31, Galaxy A41, Galaxy A51, Galaxy A71, Galaxy A51 5G, and Galaxy A71 5G. The Galaxy A01 Core was the second ultra-budget model within the Galaxy A series, the first being 2019's Galaxy A2 Core.

Samsung Galaxy Ax2 series 
Samsung introduced the 2021 Galaxy A series in September 2020. The series has increased RAM and storage options, various camera upgrades, optical image stabilization on higher-end models, and 5G on a wider range of models, with some featuring larger screens than the LTE counterparts. It also shifts away from Exynos SoCs in favor of Qualcomm and MediaTek, as Exynos SoCs are now focused only on flagship models. IP67 rating returned for the higher-end models after being absent in two previous generations.

The series currently comprises twelve models – Galaxy A02, Galaxy A02s, Galaxy A12, Galaxy A22, Galaxy A22 5G, Galaxy A32, Galaxy A32 5G, Galaxy A42 5G, Galaxy A52, Galaxy A52 5G, Galaxy A52s 5G, and Galaxy A72.

Samsung Galaxy Ax3 series 
Samsung introduced the 2022 Galaxy A series in August 2021. The series introduced larger screens (on both LTE and 5G versions compared to the previous generation which was only reserved for 5G versions), various camera upgrades, and the return of the peach device color option after it was absent in two previous generations.

The series currently consists of nine models or possibly more depending on the country or 
region. – Galaxy A03 Core, Galaxy A03, Galaxy A03s, Galaxy A13, Galaxy A13 (5G), Galaxy A23, Galaxy A23 (5G), Galaxy A33 (5G), Galaxy A53 (5G), Galaxy A73 (5G)

Samsung Galaxy Ax4 series 
Samsung introduced the 2023 Galaxy A series in 2022.

The series currently consists of nine models or possibly more depending on the country or 
region. – Galaxy A04e, Galaxy A04, Galaxy A04s, Galaxy A14, Galaxy A14 5G, Galaxy A34 5G, Galaxy A54 5G

Phones

Samsung Galaxy Alpha and A (2015) series

Samsung Galaxy A (2016) series

Samsung Galaxy A (2017) series

Samsung Galaxy A (2018) series

Samsung Galaxy Ax0 series

Samsung Galaxy Ax1 series

Samsung Galaxy Ax2 series

Samsung Galaxy Ax3 series

Samsung Galaxy Ax4 series

Tablets

2015 lineup

Galaxy Tab A 8.0 (2015)

Galaxy Tab A 9.7 (2015)

2016 lineup

Galaxy Tab A 10.1 (2016)

Galaxy Tab 7.0 (2016)

2017 lineup

Galaxy Tab A 8.0 (2017)

2018 lineup

Galaxy Tab A 10.5 (2018)

Galaxy Tab A 8.0 (2018)

2019 lineup

2020 lineup

2021 lineup

2022 lineup

References 

Samsung mobile phones
Samsung Galaxy
Android (operating system) devices
Samsung mobile series